Alice Payne is a Canadian geologist, and became the first female president of the Canadian Society of Petroleum Geologists in 1992.

Early life and education 
Born in Edmonton, Alberta in 1940 as the eldest of three children, Payne spent much of her time in Yellowknife, Northwest Territories supervising work at her father's gold mine and prospecting minerals. Her mother was a nurse and preferred for Payne to pursue a traditional woman's occupation, resulting in Payne's enrollment at Havergal College, an all-girls school in Toronto, in 1955. She was awarded the Old Girls Life Achievement Award by Havergal. Payne earned her BSc in Geology at the University of Alberta in 1962, and was the only female in her graduating class.

Career 
After graduation, Payne joined the Geological Survey of Canada in 1962 where her work was limited to the lab, a typical situation as women-geologists worked only as lab technicians in the 1960s. Wanting to perform field work, Payne obtained an MSc in Geology at the University of Alberta in 1965, but the higher degree did not promote her to field work as she had hoped.

Social norms towards female scientists were changing in the late 1960s, and Payne found work in short-term projects, and for the University. In 1979, Payne was hired as an exploration geologist for Gulf Canada Resources in Calgary, Alberta where she continued as Senior Geologist for 15 years. During her time at Gulf Canada Resources, she used her expertise in hardrock mining to introduce a new method for searching for oil and gas, and was eventually promoted to supervisor, a rarity in those times for a woman. 
In 1992, she became the first female president of the Canadian Society of Petroleum Geologists (CSPG), then acted as director of the Calgary Science Centre from 1995 to 1997. Payne retired in 1995, and started her own company Arctic Enterprises Limited.

In 2000, she published Quin Kola: Tom Payne's Search for Gold about her father.

Awards 

Order of Canada (1997)
 YWCA of Calgary's Women of Distinction for Science, Technology and the Environment (1998)
1997-1998 Service Awards (CSPG) 
2000 Honorary Doctor of Laws Degree, University of Calgary

References

Further reading 
 Canadian Society of Petroleum Geologists 1997-1998 Report

1940 births
Living people
Canadian geologists
Scientists from Edmonton
University of Alberta alumni
Canadian biographers
Writers from Edmonton
21st-century Canadian women writers